Pandabeswar railway station is a railway station of Andal–Sainthia branch line of the Asansol railway division connecting from  to Sainthia on the Sahibganj loop line. This is under the jurisdiction of Eastern Railway zone of Indian Railways. It is situated at Pandabeswar, Paschim Bardhaman district in the Indian state of West Bengal. The railway station serves Pandaveswar Area. Number of Express and Passenger train stop at Pandabeswar railway station.

History
The Andal–Sainthia branch line was built in 1913. Electrification of Andal–Pandabeshwar section including Pandabeswar railway station was completed in 2010–11 and Pandabeshwar-Saithia route was completed in 2016.

References

Railway stations in Paschim Bardhaman district
Asansol railway division